VH1 Storytellers is a concert and discussion DVD by Bruce Springsteen, expanded from the airing of an episode of the VH1 television series VH1 Storytellers on April 23, 2005.  Tied into promotion for his album Devils & Dust at the time, it was released in video form half a year later.

The filming for the program and video was done on April 4, 2005 at the newly opened Two River Theater in Red Bank, New Jersey.  He played guitar and piano and sang as he dissected his songs for meaning, sometimes line by line, frequently confessing at the end that his analysis was cooked for the show and that his original writing had been more subconscious.  Wife Patti Scialfa contributed the occasional helping vocal.  A question and answer session with contest winning audience members also ensued.

Songs performed and discussed 
 "Devils & Dust"
 "Blinded by the Light"
 "Brilliant Disguise"
 "Nebraska"
 "Jesus Was an Only Son"
 "Waitin' on a Sunny Day"
 "The Rising"
 "Thunder Road"

Charts

Certifications

References

External links 
 

Bruce Springsteen video albums
2005 live albums
Bruce Springsteen live albums
2005 video albums
Live video albums
VH1 Storytellers
2000s English-language films